Perley Poore Sheehan (7 June 1875 in Cincinnati, Ohio, United States – 30 September 1943 in Sierra Madre, California, United States) was an American film writer, novelist and film director. He was once married to Virginia Point (1902-unknown). Sheehan also wrote detective and adventure fiction for the pulp magazines. Sheehan wrote two fantasy novels, The Abyss of Wonders (1915), about a lost civilisation in the Gobi Desert, and The Red Road to Shamballah (1932-1933) about a hero with a Tibetan magic sword.

Works

Filmography as a film writer 
(note: most of manuscripts below are movies, which are based on his novels.)
 The Dragon (1916)
 The Bugler of Algiers (1916)
 The Whispering Chorus (1918)
 Brave and Bold (1918)
 A Society Sensation (1918)
 Upstairs (1919)
 Three Sevens (1921)
 For Those We Love (1921)
 If You Believe It, It's So (1922)
 Always the Woman (1922)
 The Old Homestead (1922)
 The Man Who Saw Tomorrow (1922)
 The Hunchback of Notre Dame (1923)
 The Night Message (1924)
 Love and Glory (1924)
 The Way of All Flesh (1927)
 The Lost City (1935)

Filmography as a film director 
 The Night Message (1924)

Plays 
 Efficiency (with Robert H. Davis) (1917). This may have been developed from the playscript published by Sheehan and Robert H Davis in The Strand Magazine in 1917, 'Blood and Iron'.

Novels 

 Seer (1912)
 The Prophet (1912)
 The Copper Princess (1913) [to be reprinted by Murania Press]
 We are French! (with Robert H. Davis) (1914)
 The Woman of the Pyramid (1914) [reprinted by Steeger Books]
 The Abyss of Wonders (1915) [reprinted by Murania Press]
 Those Who Walk in Darkness (1917) [reprinted by Fiction House Press]
 Passport invisible (1918)
 The One Gift (1920)
 House with a Bad Name (1920) [reprinted by Fiction House Press]
 The Whispering Chorus (1928)
 King Arthur (Chapbook) (1936)
 Heidi (Chapbook) (1936)
 Lola Montez, her pagan majesty, or, Queen errant (1936)
 Blennerhassett (Chapbook) (1937)

Short Stories Collections 
 Doctor Coffin: The Living Dead Man Off-Trail Publications (2007)
 The Red Road to Shamballah Black Dog Books (2008)
 The Leopard Man and Other Stories Pulpville Press
 Kwa of the Jungle (written as Paul Regard) Pulpville Press

References

External links

 
 
 
Play by Perley Poore Sheehan on Great War Theatre database

1875 births
1943 deaths
American male novelists
Chapbook writers
American male screenwriters
American mystery writers
American fantasy writers
Pulp fiction writers
Writers from Cincinnati
People from Sierra Madre, California
Novelists from California
Novelists from Ohio
Film directors from California
Screenwriters from California
Screenwriters from Ohio
20th-century American male writers
20th-century American screenwriters